Carabus alexandrae alexandrae is a subspecies of black coloured beetle from family Carabidae, that is endemic to Gansu, China.

References

alexandrae alexandrae
Beetles described in 1887
Beetles of Asia
Endemic fauna of Gansu
Taxa named by Andrey Semyonov-Tyan-Shansky